Communauté d'agglomération Épernay, Coteaux et Plaine de Champagne is the communauté d'agglomération, an intercommunal structure, centred on the town of Épernay. It is located in the Marne department, in the Grand Est region, northeastern France. Created in 2017, its seat is in Épernay. Its area is 586.9 km2. Its population was 47,514 in 2019, of which 22,433 in Épernay proper.

Composition
The communauté d'agglomération consists of the following 47 communes:

Athis
Avize
Bergères-lès-Vertus
Blancs-Coteaux
Brugny-Vaudancourt
Chaintrix-Bierges
Chaltrait
Chavot-Courcourt
Chouilly
Clamanges
Cramant
Cuis
Cumières
Écury-le-Repos
Épernay
Étréchy
Flavigny
Germinon
Givry-lès-Loisy
Grauves
Les Istres-et-Bury
Loisy-en-Brie
Magenta
Mancy
Mardeuil
Le Mesnil-sur-Oger
Monthelon
Morangis
Moslins
Moussy
Oiry
Pierre-Morains
Pierry
Plivot
Pocancy
Rouffy
Saint-Mard-lès-Rouffy
Soulières
Trécon
Val-des-Marais
Vélye
Vert-Toulon
Villeneuve-Renneville-Chevigny
Villers-aux-Bois
Villeseneux
Vinay
Vouzy

References

Epernay
Epernay